The 1915 Brooklyn Tip-Tops season was a season in American baseball. The Tip-Tops finished in 7th place in the Federal League, 16 games behind the Chicago Whales.  The season was notable in that it featured one of the only known major-league professional baseball games of the modern era in which admission was free (June 28, 1914, vs. the Chicago Whales).

Regular season

Season standings

Record vs. opponents

Roster

Player stats

Batting

Starters by position 
Note: Pos = Position; G = Games played; AB = At bats; H = Hits; Avg. = Batting average; HR = Home runs; RBI = Runs batted in

Other batters 
Note: G = Games played; AB = At bats; H = Hits; Avg. = Batting average; HR = Home runs; RBI = Runs batted in

Pitching

Starting pitchers 
Note: G = Games pitched; IP = Innings pitched; W = Wins; L = Losses; ERA = Earned run average; SO = Strikeouts

Other pitchers 
Note: G = Games pitched; IP = Innings pitched; W = Wins; L = Losses; ERA = Earned run average; SO = Strikeouts

Relief pitchers 
Note: G = Games pitched; W = Wins; L = Losses; SV = Saves; ERA = Earned run average; SO = Strikeouts

Notes

References 
1915 Brooklyn Tip-Tops at Baseball Reference

Brooklyn Tip-Tops seasons
Brooklyn Tip-Tops season
1915 in sports in New York City
1910s in Brooklyn
Park Slope